The Secretary of State for Transport, also referred to as the transport secretary, is a secretary of state in the Government of the United Kingdom, with overall responsibility for the policies of the Department for Transport. The incumbent is a member of the Cabinet of the United Kingdom.

The office holder works alongside the other transport ministers. The corresponding shadow minister is the shadow secretary of state for transport, and the secretary of state is also scrutinised by the Transport Select Committee.

History 
The Ministry of Transport absorbed the Ministry of Shipping and was renamed the Ministry of War Transport in 1941, but resumed its previous name at the end of the war.

The Ministry of Civil Aviation was created by Winston Churchill in 1944 to look at peaceful ways of using aircraft and to find something for the aircraft factories to do after the war. The new Conservative government in 1951 appointed the same minister to both Transport and Civil Aviation, finally amalgamating the ministries on 1 October 1953.

The Ministry was renamed back to the Ministry of Transport on 14 October 1959, when a separate Ministry of Aviation was formed.

Transport responsibilities were subsumed by the Department for the Environment, headed by the secretary of state for the environment from 15 October 1970 to 10 September 1976.

The Department for Transport was recreated as a separate department by James Callaghan in 1976.

The super-department Department of the Environment, Transport and the Regions was created in 1997 for Deputy Prime Minister John Prescott.

In 2001, the Department of the Environment, Transport and the Regions was widely considered unwieldy and so was broken up, with the Transport functions now combined with Local Government and the Regions in the DTLR (Department for Transport, Local Government and the Regions). Critics argued from the outset that this was a mistake and that a post of secretary of state for transport was needed in its own right.

List of Ministers and Secretary of State

Minister of Transport (1919–1941)

Colour key (for political parties):

Minister of (War) Transport and Minister of Civil Aviation (1941–1953)

Colour key (for political parties):

Minister of Transport and Civil Aviation (1953–1959)

Colour key (for political parties):

Minister of Transport (1959–1970)

Colour key (for political parties):

Minister within the Department of the Environment (1970–1976)

Colour key (for political parties):

The junior ministers responsible for transport within the Department for the Environment:

Minister for Transport Industries (1970–1974)
 John Peyton (Conservative, 15 October 1970 – 7 March 1974)

Minister for Transport (1974–1976)
 Fred Mulley (Labour, 7 March 1974 – 12 June 1975)
 John Gilbert (Labour, 12 June 1975 – 10 September 1976)

Secretary of State for Transport (1976–1979)
Colour key (for political parties):

Minister of Transport (1979–1981)
Not an official member of the cabinet.

Colour key (for political parties):

Secretary of State for Transport (1981–1997)
Colour key (for political parties):

Secretary of State for Environment, Transport and the Regions (1997–2001)

Colour key (for political parties):

Secretary of State for Transport, Local Government and the Regions (2001–2002)
Colour key (for political parties):

After Byers' resignation, such a division was made, with the portfolios of Local Government and the Regions transferred to the Office of the Deputy Prime Minister.

During the lifetime of DTLGR, John Spellar served as Minister of State for Transport with a right to attend Cabinet.

 John Spellar (8 June 2001 – 29 May 2002)

Secretary of State for Transport (2002–present)
Colour key (for political parties):

See also
 Ministry of Civil Aviation Aerodrome Fire Service

References

External links
Track record: Transport secretaries

Transport
Ministerial offices in the United Kingdom
Department for Transport
Transport ministers
1919 establishments in the United Kingdom